Jari Haapalainen (born 1971) is a Finnish-Swedish musician, songwriter and producer. He was born to Finnish immigrant parents. Haapalainen resides in Berlin, Germany. He played lead guitar for The Bear Quartet, and used to be a member in the pop combo Heikki.

Jari has produced several artists during the past twenty years, among others Laakso, Ed Harcourt, Camera Obscura, The Loveable Tulips and The Concretes.

As a producer (selection)
 A Taste of Ra:
 Avantgardet: Smile and Wave 
 Mattias Alkberg BD: Ditt Hjärta Är En Stjärna
 The Bear Quartet: 15 albums
 Camera Obscura: Let's Get Out of This Country, My Maudlin Career
 The Concretes: The Concretes, Hey Trouble
 Nicolai Dunger: six albums
 Eldkvarn: five albums
 Anna Maria Espinosa: Glowing With You
 Kajsa Grytt: Brott & Straff - historier från ett kvinnofängelse, En kvinna under påverkan, Jag ler, jag dör
 Ed Harcourt: Strangers, The Beautiful Lie
 Heikki: Heikki, Heikki II
 Honey Is Cool: Bolero!, Early Morning Are You Working?, Baby Jane
 Frida Hyvönen: three albums
 [ingenting]: Tomhet, Idel Tomhet
 The (International) Noise Conspiracy: two albums
 Johnossi: All They Ever Wanted
 Siri Karlsson - three albums
 Markus Krunegård: Rastlöst Blod
 Laakso: four albums
 Lacrosse: Bandages For The Heart
 Eric Malmberg: Verklighet & Beat
 Moneybrother: four albums
 The Plan: Walk For Gold
 Sahara Hotnights: Sahara Hotnights
 : Jorden Var Rund
 Stella Rocket: Stella Rocket
 The Tiny: Starring: Someone Like You
 True Moon-True Moon
 Rebecka Törnqvist: Scorpions
 Kristofer Åström & Hidden Truck - two albums
 Vega: two albums
 Vånna Inget: Ingen Botten

As a musician
 2016 - Fusion Machine (with JH3-Jari Haapalainen Trio)
 2017 - Fusion Madness (with [Jari Haapalainen Trio)

References

1971 births
Living people
Swedish rock guitarists
The Bear Quartet members
Swedish people of Finnish descent
21st-century guitarists